The Breaking Point is a 1921 American silent drama film directed by Paul Scardon and starring Bessie Barriscale, Walter McGrail and Ethel Grey Terry.

Cast
 Bessie Barriscale as Ruth Marshall
 Walter McGrail as Richard Janeway
 Ethel Grey Terry as Lucia Deeping
 Eugenie Besserer as Mrs. Janeway
 Pat O'Malley as Phillip Bradley
 Winter Hall as Dr. Hillyer
 Wilfred Lucas as Mortimer Davidson
 Joseph J. Dowling as Mrs. Marshall
 Lydia Knott as Mrs. Marshall
 Irene Yeager as Camilla

References

Bibliography
 Munden, Kenneth White. The American Film Institute Catalog of Motion Pictures Produced in the United States, Part 1. University of California Press, 1997.

External links
 

1921 films
1921 drama films
1920s English-language films
American silent feature films
Silent American drama films
Films directed by Paul Scardon
Films distributed by W. W. Hodkinson Corporation
1920s American films